Futagoyama may refer to:

 Futagoyama stable, a stable of sumo wrestlers from 1962 until 2004
 Wakanohana Kanji I (1928–2010), sumo wrestler and head of Futagoyama stable until 1993
 Takanohana Kenshi (1950–2005), sumo wrestler and head of Futagoyama stable until 2004
 Futagoyama stable (2018), a stable of sumo wrestlers established in 2018
 Miyabiyama Tetsushi (1977–), sumo wrestler and head of the new Futagoyama stable